A himation was a type of clothing, a mantle or wrap worn by ancient Greek men and women from the Archaic through the Hellenistic periods (c. 750–30 BC). 
It was usually worn over a chiton and/or peplos, but was made of heavier drape and played the role of a cloak or shawl.  When the himation was used alone, without a chiton, and served both as a chiton and as a cloak, it was called an achiton.  The himation was markedly less voluminous than the Roman toga. It was usually a large rectangular piece of woollen cloth. Many vase paintings depict women wearing a himation as a veil covering their faces.

The himation continued into the Byzantine era as "iconographic dress" used in art and by the lower classes, worn by Christ, the Virgin Mary, and biblical figures.

Wearing styles 

Himation is not kept in place using pins, unlike other types of Ancient Greek overgarments. When worn by men, the himation is draped over the left shoulder and wrapped around the rest of their body, except for their right arms. For women, the himation allows for either the right or the left arm to be freed from the garment.

Vases depicting life during the start of Archaic Greece showed that men of all ages and social classes wore the himation over the chiton. But by the 6th century, only certain groups of men continued to wear both (e.g., priests, father of the bride, mythological figures); unmarried men and married men alike only wore the himation. Women also started wearing both the chiton and himation during the same period and continued the practice into the Hellenistic period. Older boys, who are above the age of ephebos, when not wearing the style followed by adult men, covered their entire body with the himation.

Though there is no exact rule to follow in wearing himation – except during worship in Greek sanctuaries – the style which a person adopts can provide a different meaning and society judges a person's character from how they chose to wear their himation. Which body parts they chose to reveal also led others to perceive them differently. Ancient Greek philosophers at the time mention this perspective in their works. One of them, Theophrastus, described Boorishness in his work Characters, as a person who sits while allowing his himation to be draped above his knees.

For women, himation can also be worn as veils, as depicted in several vases from the Archaic era. Despite this, women rarely wore himation without a chiton, especially those of the elite class.

See also
 Chiton (costume)
 Clothing in ancient Greece
 Clothing in the ancient world
 Exomis
 Stephane (Ancient Greece)
 Tunic
 Zoster (costume)

References

External links 

Byzantine clothing
Greek clothing
Robes and cloaks